Tanit Phoenix (born 24 September 1980) is a South African fashion model, actress and makeup artist. She is known for her swimwear and lingerie photo shoots after appearing in a Sports Illustrated Swimsuit Issue in 2003 and in GQ magazine and FHM in the same year.

Early life
Tanit Phoenix was born in Durban, KwaZulu-Natal, and is of Dutch and Irish descent.

Modelling career
Phoenix began her career in Durban, South Africa at the age of 14, after being discovered by a modelling scout in her hometown, Westville. She has appeared in international TV commercials for Adidas,  Coca-Cola, Volvic water, Aqua-mineral, Visine, Schweppes, American Swiss Jewellery, Citroën C3, Nivea, Alberto VO5, Aria, Transition Lenses, Volvic, Distractions lingerie campaign and Veet television commercials and campaign which she held for 5 years.

Phoenix appeared in the European TV ad for Fa shower gel, skydiving. She was then chosen to be a cover girl for German Maxim in 2004 after being named "Who's That Girl?" at the Woman of the Year German Maxim awards in 2003, and then appeared on the cover of American Maxim the year after. She was ranked #5 in the FHM 100 Sexiest Women in the World poll of South African FHM readers in 2004, #6 in 2005, #10 in 2006, #40 in 2007. In 2011 Phoenix won "IGN's Sexiest woman of the year". She was the most popular girl ever photographed for Babeology by IGN.

She has appeared on the cover of South African Cosmopolitan four times, South African and American FHM numerous times, Legacy, Indwe, South African Marie Claire, German and South African Shape and South African GQ magazines, and has frequently been shot for Sports Illustrated Swimsuit Issue. In May 2014 Tanit Phoenix appeared on the cover for Maxim South Africa.

Acting career
Phoenix began her acting career with a brief appearance as one of Jared Leto's girlfriends in the 2005 film Lord of War, and the South African-Canadian mystery series Charlie Jade as Malachi's associate in the episode "Things Unseen". In 2007 she filmed a role in Gallowwalkers, opposite Wesley Snipes. The film was not released until it went to video in 2013. In 2008 she appeared in the thriller Kamasutra Nights (also known as Maya).

In 2010, she starred in the horror film Lost Boys: The Thirst and in the comedy Spud opposite John Cleese.

In 2011, Phoenix appeared in the TV series Femme Fatales, where she was the narrator of the show and appeared for a snippet of every episode. She also had a minor role in Safe House, and plays the sexy antagonist alongside Leon Schuster in the 2012 movie Mad Buddies.

Phoenix starred in Death Race 2 and Death Race 3: Inferno alongside Luke Goss and Danny Trejo and reprised her role as Eve Wilson in Spud 2: The Madness Continues.

Make-up artist career
In 2013, Phoenix took her first job as the key makeup artist and designer of the character Jimmy on the P.O.V. action film Hardcore Henry. Jimmy was played by her husband Sharlto Copley. She transformed him into 11 different characters.

Personal life
Phoenix has been in a relationship with actor Sharlto Copley since January 2012. On 15 February 2016, they married in Cape Town, South Africa, and announced their first child together on 1 January 2017.

Phoenix resides with her husband alternating between their houses in Cape Town and Los Angeles.

Phoenix is a vegan.

Filmography

References

External links

South African television actresses
Actors from Durban
South African people of Dutch descent
South African people of Irish descent
South African female models
South African expatriates in the United States
Living people
1980 births
Afrikaner people